The German Evangelical St. Johns Church on Church Avenue in Hebron, North Dakota, also known as the Deutsche Evangelische St. Johannes Kirche, is now known as St. John United Church of Christ. The church building was listed on the National Register of Historic Places in 2001.

History
The Gothic Revival structure was designed by Hancock Brothers of Fargo, North Dakota and was built  in 1908 by contractor Henry Bomgarten with stonemasonry by Conrad Klick of Hebron.  The parish house was designed by architect Turner, Inc., of Dickinson, North Dakota and built by contractor Peter Kolling & Son, also of Dickinson. The building was constructed of brick provided by the Hebron Brick Company.

References

Other sources
Hebron's Heritage: A History, 1885-1960

German-American culture in North Dakota
Churches on the National Register of Historic Places in North Dakota
Gothic Revival church buildings in North Dakota
Churches completed in 1908
National Register of Historic Places in Morton County, North Dakota
1908 establishments in North Dakota